Gbenro Ajibade   (born Gbenro Emmanuel Ajibade; December 8) is a Nigerian actor, producer, model, and presenter.

Biography
He attended Makurdi International School and later Mount Saint Gabriel's Secondary School. He then completed his education by graduating from Benue State University with a degree in biology.

He is a leading character in the popular soap operaTinsel and has acted in Gbomo Gbomo Express and The Wages.

Ajibade won Most Outstanding Actor/Model of the Year at the 2011 Nigerian Model Achievers Awards.

Personal life
He was married to actress Osas Ighodaro, together, they have one daughter, Azariah Tiwatope Osarugue Ajibade. They got divorced in 2019 after four years of marriage.

Filmography

Films
 Gbomo Gbomo Express (2015)
 30's (2015)
 The Wages (2013)
 Twisted Thorne (2011)
 Bachelor's Eve

Television
 Tinsel (2008–current)

See also
List of Yoruba people

References

External links

 Official website 

Living people
Nigerian male film actors
Nigerian male models
Nigerian television presenters
21st-century Nigerian male actors
Yoruba male actors
Yoruba male models
Benue State University alumni
20th-century births
People from Maiduguri
Year of birth missing (living people)
Nigerian male television actors
Nigerian television personalities
Nigerian film producers
Nigerian radio presenters